Persatuan Sepakbola Indonesia Nabire (simply known as Persinab Nabire or Persinab) is an Indonesian football club based in Nabire Regency, Central Papua. They compete in the Liga 3.

Honour
 2011-12 : Champions Division 2 (Promotion to Division 1)
 2011-13 : Position 5th Division 1

Sponsors
 Fourking Mandiri
 Bank Papua

Kit Supplier
 SPECS (2008 - 2011)

References

Football clubs in Indonesia
Football clubs in Central Papua
Association football clubs established in 2004
2004 establishments in Indonesia